"Night and Day" is a popular song by Cole Porter that was written for the 1932 musical Gay Divorce. It is perhaps Porter's most popular contribution to the Great American Songbook and has been recorded by dozens of musicians. NPR says "within three months of the show's opening, more than 30 artists had recorded the song."

Fred Astaire introduced "Night and Day" on November 29, 1932, when Gay Divorce opened at the Ethel Barrymore Theatre. A week earlier, at Victor’s Gramercy Recording Studio in Manhattan, he gathered with Leo Reisman and His Orchestra to make a record of two Cole Porter compositions, 'Night and Day' backed with "I've Got You on My Mind". All was done under the dark shadow cast by the 1929 Stock Market Crash, which had spawned the Great Depression, the worst economic disaster in American history. In just over two years, record industry revenues had fallen from $100 million to $6 million, driving all but three companies (RCA Victor, American Record Corporation (ARC) and Columbia) out of business. The single was released as Victor 24193 on January 13, 1933, and it went on to become the top selling record of the year, with 22,811 copies sold.

On May 23, 1933, Astaire recorded it again (due to anti-trust concerns) for Columbia Graphophone Company Ltd., which was now a part of Electric and Musical Industries (EMI). It was released in the United Kingdom in October on Columbia DB 1215, backed with "After You Who?", another Porter composition. Reisman, under contract to RCA Victor, was unable to accompany Astaire on this record. It can be distinguished from the US version because it is fifteen seconds shorter (3:10).

Another Fred Astaire version in circulation is from the soundtrack of the 1934 motion picture, The Gay Divorcee, starring Fred Astaire and Ginger Rogers. After the film opened on October 19, this version was released, and has appeared on record albums over the years. It is almost five minutes long, and Astaire sings and dances for the duration. Astaire is accompanied by Max Steiner and the RKO Radio Studio Orchestra.

The next release was recorded in December 1952, and released the following year in a four LP set called The Astaire Story, which provided an overview of songs Astaire had performed during his career. The musicians included Oscar Peterson and all the songs were fresh recordings. This version of "Night and Day" was over five minutes long.

There are several accounts about the song's origin. One mentions that Porter was inspired by an Islamic prayer when he visited Morocco. Another account says he was inspired by the Moorish architecture of the Alcazar Hotel in Cleveland Heights, Ohio. Others mention that he was inspired by a Mosaic of the Mausoleum of Galla Placidia in Ravenna, he had been visiting during a trip of his honeymoon in Italy.

The song was so associated with Porter that when Hollywood filmed his life story in 1946, the movie was entitled Night and Day.

Song structure
The construction of "Night and Day" is unusual for a hit song of the 1930s. Most popular tunes then featured 32-bar choruses, divided into four 8-bar sections, usually with an AABA musical structure, the B section representing the bridge.

Porter's song, on the other hand, has a chorus of 48 bars, divided into six sections of eight bars—ABABCB—with section C representing the bridge.

Harmonic structure
"Night and Day" has unusual chord changes (the underlying harmony).

The tune begins with a pedal (repeated) dominant with a major seventh chord built on the flattened sixth of the key, which then resolves to the dominant seventh in the next bar. If performed in the key of B, the first chord is therefore G major seventh, with an F (the major seventh above the harmonic root) in the melody, before resolving to F7 and eventually B maj7.

This section repeats and is followed by a descending harmonic sequence starting with a -75 (half diminished seventh chord or Ø) built on the augmented fourth of the key, and descending by semitones—with changes in the chord quality—to the supertonic minor seventh, which forms the beginning of a more standard II-V-I progression. In B, this sequence begins with an EØ, followed by an E-7, D-7 and D dim, before resolving onto C-7 (the supertonic minor seventh) and cadencing onto B.

The bridge is also unusual, with an immediate, fleeting and often (depending on the version) unprepared key change up a minor third, before an equally transient and unexpected return to the key centre. In B, the bridge begins with a D major seventh, then moves back to B with a B major seventh chord. This repeats, and is followed by a recapitulation of the second section outlined above.

The vocal verse is also unusual in that most of the melody consists entirely of a single note repeated 35 times —the same dominant pedal, that begins the body of the song—with rather inconclusive and unusual harmonies underneath.

Notable recordings
Billie Holiday recorded the song on more than one occasion. A single was recorded on December 13, 1939, New York, with "The Man I Love" as a b-side, on the Vocalion label, with Walter Page on bass, Joe Sullivan on piano, Jo Jones on drums, Earl Warren on alt sax, Lester Young on tenor sax, Jack Washington on baritone sax, Buck Clayton and Harry Edison on trumpet and Freddie Green on guitar.
Frank Sinatra recorded the song at least five times, including with Axel Stordahl in his first solo session in 1942 and again with him in 1947, with Nelson Riddle in 1956 for A Swingin' Affair!, with Don Costa in 1961 for Sinatra and Strings, and a disco version with Joe Beck in 1977. When Harry James heard Sinatra sing this song, he signed him. Sinatra's 1942 version reaching the No. 16 spot in the U.S.
Bing Crosby recorded the song on February 11, 1944 and it appeared on the Billboard chart briefly in 1946 with a peak position of No. 21.
American cabaret singer Frances Faye recorded a cover of the song in 1952 for Capitol Records. The single was later released as part of the 1953 compilation album No Reservations. Seven years later, Faye recorded yet another version of "Night and Day" for her 1959 album Caught in the Act, where she notably altered some of the lyrics.
Charlie Parker recorded the tune for his 1953 album Big Band.
Paul Evans released the song in his first album in 1954.
Jazz singer Ella Fitzgerald recorded her jazz-inflected version of the song, with big band and strings, as part of her 1956 album Ella Fitzgerald Sings the Cole Porter Song Book.
Bill Evans recorded the tune for the 1959 album Everybody Digs Bill Evans.
American tenor saxophonist Stan Getz recorded a freewheeling jazz improvisation over 10 minutes long Kildevælds Church, Copenhagen, Denmark on January 14 & 15, 1960, which is the opening track on Stan Getz at Large (1960).
Jazz saxophonist Joe Henderson recorded a version of "Night and Day" on his 1966 album Inner Urge, along with McCoy Tyner (on piano), Bob Cranshaw (on bass) and Elvin Jones (on drums).
Sergio Mendes & Brasil '66 released the song as a bossa nova and jazz-influenced single from their 1967 album Equinox. It went to number eight on the US adult contemporary chart.
Jackie DeShannon released the song in her 10th album New Image in 1967.
The song was recorded by Ringo Starr in 1970 for his first solo album Sentimental Journey.
Jazz guitarist Joe Pass recorded a solo fingerpicking instrumental version for his 1973 album Virtuoso.
On The Muppet Show, Muppet mummies sing it in the 1980 Gladys Knight episode.
Everything but the Girl chose this song for their first single in 1983. It reached No. 92 in August 1982.
Irish rock band U2 recorded a version of the song that was featured on the 1990 Red Hot + Blue benefit compilation album to fight AIDS. It reached #2 on the Modern Rock Tracks chart and presaged the electronic sound the band would explore on Achtung Baby the following year.
American jazz singer Karrin Allyson included the song in her 1995 album Azure-Té.
American rock band Chicago recorded the song in their 1995 album Night & Day: Big Band.
The Temptations recorded the song for the soundtrack of the 2000 film What Women Want.
Actor/singer John Barrowman recorded the song for the soundtrack of the 2004 film of Cole Porter’s life and career De-Lovely.
Rod Stewart sang his own version of the song on his 2004 album Stardust: The Great American Songbook, Volume III.
English actor, presenter, and singer Bradley Walsh recorded the song for his debut album Chasing Dreams in 2016.
Richard Cheese's cover of the song appears in the 2016 motion picture Batman v Superman: Dawn of Justice.
Canadian jazz pianist and singer Diana Krall included the song on her album Turn Up the Quiet (2017).
Willie Nelson included it on his 2018 Sinatra tribute album My Way.
Tony Bennett and Lady Gaga recorded a version of the song for their 2021 collaborative album Love for Sale.

References

1932 songs
1933 singles
Ella Fitzgerald songs
Frank Sinatra songs
Fred Astaire songs
1983 debut singles
Everything but the Girl songs
1930s jazz standards
Songs from Gay Divorce
Songs written by Cole Porter
Jazz compositions in E-flat major